Pacific Tower may refer to:

1600 Pacific Tower, a skyscraper in Dallas, Texas, USA
Fresno Pacific Towers, a building in Fresno, California, USA
Georgia-Pacific Tower, a skyscraper in downtown Atlanta, Georgia, USA
Pacific Plaza Towers, residential skyscrapers in Makati, Philippines
Pacific Tower, Christchurch, a building in Christchurch, New Zealand
Pacific Tower (Seattle), a building in Seattle, Washington, USA
Rufino Pacific Tower, a skyscraper in Makati, Philippines